Carl Daniel Gioia, born January 24, 1985, is a former National Collegiate Athletic Association placekicker for the University of Notre Dame.

High school years
Gioia attended Valparaiso High School in Valparaiso, Indiana and was a good student and a letterman in football. In football, he was a four-year letterman, was named as an All-State selection by the Indiana Football Coaches Association for three years, and as a senior, he was also named as an IFCA Academic All-State selection, named as a National Football Foundation Scholar-Athlete, and was selected as the Indiana Mister Football Kicker Position Award. Carl Daniel Gioia graduated from Valparaiso High School in 2003.

Post-college

Following his college career at Notre Dame, Gioia attended dental school at the University of Louisville.  After graduating at the top of his class, he entered into Louisville's Orthodontics Residency Program.  He now practices orthodontics in Louisville, KY.

References

Gioia now attends the University of Louisville School of Dentistry, where he is the class of 2011 president.

External links 
Carl Gioia, player bio at the athletic site of the University of Notre Dame

1985 births
Living people
People from Valparaiso, Indiana
American football placekickers
Notre Dame Fighting Irish football players